William Campbell was a Creole businessman who worked at Connaught Hospital during the early 1900s.

William Campbell was the son of Oluwole John Campbell and Sarah Campbell and the brother of John William Campbell, a deputy mayor of Freetown, Sierra Leone and Justice of Peace of the Colony of Sierra Leone. 

William Campbell married Esther Thomas of Settler Town, Sierra Leone and the two had six children together. William Campbell was buried at Racecourse Cemetery. His only surviving daughter, Sarah Rebecca Letitia Campbell died at age 101.

Sources
https://web.archive.org/web/20071226143107/http://cocorioko.slvp.org/app/index.php?option=com_content&task=view&id=146&Itemid=1

Campbell family (Sierra Leone)
Sierra Leone Creole people